Saetta Saves the Queen (Italian: Saetta salva la regina) is a 1920 Italian silent adventure film directed by Ettore Ridoni and starring Domenico Gambino.

Cast
 Domenico Gambino as Saetta 
 Raffaele di Napoli 
 Guido Pistono 
 Tina Ronay 
 Lina Spina 
 Luigi Stinchi

References

Bibliography
 Jacqueline Reich. The Maciste Films of Italian Silent Cinema. Indiana University Press, 2015.

External links

1920 films
1920s Italian-language films
Italian silent feature films
Italian black-and-white films
Italian adventure films
1920 adventure films
Silent adventure films
1920s Italian films